Falcon Records may refer to:
Falcon Records (Texas), a record label from to 1940s to the 1980s
Falcon Records (Canadian label), a record label in existence from 1979 to 1985
Falcon Records (Massachusetts), a record label from Bentley University
Falcon Records, a subsidiary of Vee-Jay records renamed Abner Records